Gianfranco Di Julio (born 7 July 1986) was an Italian–Venezuelan footballer.

Di Julio participated in the Venezuela national under-20 football team in 2005. He began his career with several clubs in his native Italy, including Calcio Chieti. In 2007, Di Julio continued his career in Spain, playing for Villarreal CF C and then UD Salamanca B.

In the second semester of 2008, Di Julio moved to Venezuela for play in Centro Italo. In 2009, he signed for Deportivo Italia.

External links
Profile at BDFA

1986 births
Living people
Footballers from Rome
Venezuelan footballers
Association football midfielders
Villarreal CF C players
S.S. Chieti Calcio players
S.S.D. Città di Gela players
Deportivo Italia players